Chalcosyrphus (Xylotomima) satanica, the devil's leafwalker, is a rare species of syrphid fly collected in California.  Hoverflies can appear nearly motionless while in flight. The  adults, also  known as flower flies for they are commonly found around and on flowers from which they get both energy-giving nectar and protein rich pollen.

Distribution
United States.

References

Eristalinae
Insects described in 1884
Diptera of North America
Hoverflies of North America
Taxa named by Jacques-Marie-Frangile Bigot